Atheris hirsuta, commonly known as the Tai hairy bush viper, is a species of venomous bush viper that is endemic to the Tai National Park in southwestern Ivory Coast.

References

Reptiles described in 2002
Reptiles of West Africa
hirsuta
Endemic fauna of Ivory Coast